There are also two Springfield Townships in Michigan.

Springfield is a city in Calhoun County in the U.S. state of Michigan. It is an enclave of the city of Battle Creek. The population was 5,260 at the 2010 census.

Parks

Begg Park
It is home to a professional 18-hole disk golf course and hosted the 2008 Disc Golf World Championship. In addition to the disc golf course, Begg Park also has the Springfield Farmers' Market, a playground area, a picnic pavilion, open spaces, tree-shaded areas, paved walking trails, and a brook that cuts through the park's center.

Upton Park
Upton Park is a 6.2 acre park located between Nettles Street and Upton Avenue in Springfield, Michigan. The park features a 1-acre pond used for fishing and model boat racing. In addition, the park has a pavilion used for picnics, playground equipment, a basketball court, and a walking trail that circles the pond. The park is located in the Central and Eastern neighborhoods and is located at the center of one of Springfield's most established neighborhoods. Upton Park is formally known as John F. Kennedy Park.

B. Carol Hinton Park
The City of Springfield received a grant in 2012 from the Michigan Department of Natural Resources to create a park out of a small piece of city-owned property near the intersection of 27th Street and Frisbie Boulevard. The park has a basketball court and play scape enclosed by a fence.

Rothchild Park
Rothchild Park is an open park located at Helmer Road and Harmonia Road.

Government
Springfield has a council-manager form of government. The city levies an income tax of 1 percent on residents and 0.5 percent on nonresidents.

Geography

Demographics

2010 census
As of the census of 2010, there were 5,260 people, 2,156 households, and 1,213 families residing in the city. The racial makeup of the city was 76.6% White, 9.6% African American, 0.5% Native American, 7.5% Asian, 0.1% Pacific Islander, 1.1% from other races, and 4.7% from two or more races. Hispanic or Latino of any race were 4.1% of the population.

There were 2,156 households, of which 32.4% had children under the age of 18 living with them, 33.3% were married couples living together, 15.8% had a female householder with no husband present, 7.2% had a male householder with no wife present, and 43.7% were non-families. 35.4% of all households were made up of individuals, and 8.7% had someone living alone who was 65 years of age or older. The average household size was 2.38 and the average family size was 3.08.

The median age in the city was 33.8 years. 25.2% of residents were under the age of 18; 11.4% were between the ages of 18 and 24; 27.1% were from 25 to 44; 24.5% were from 45 to 64; and 11.7% were 65 years of age or older. The gender makeup of the city was 50.0% male and 50.0% female.

2000 census
As of the census of 2000, there were 5,189 people, 2,161 households, and 1,195 families residing in the city. The racial makeup of the city was 86.30% White, 7.69% African American, 0.96% Native American, 1.37% Asian, 0.02% Pacific Islander, 1.08% from other races, and 2.58% from two or more races. Hispanic or Latino of any race were 2.51% of the population.

There were 2,161 households, out of which 26.5% had children under the age of 18 living with them, 35.4% were married couples living together, 13.7% had a female householder with no husband present, and 44.7% were non-families. 36.7% of all households were made up of individuals, and 7.8% had someone living alone who was 65 years of age or older.  The average household size was 2.21 and the average family size was 2.89.

In the city, the population was spread out, with 22.4% under the age of 18, 11.3% from 18 to 24, 30.9% from 25 to 44, 20.6% from 45 to 64, and 14.8% who were 65 years of age or older.  The median age was 36 years. For every 100 females, there were 103.9 males.  For every 100 females age 18 and over, there were 102.3 males.

The median income for a household in the city was $29,790, and the median income for a family was $34,272. Males had a median income of $29,433 versus $22,830 for females. The per capita income for the city was $15,413.  About 9.0% of families and 13.0% of the population were below the poverty line, including 11.8% of those under age 18 and 8.7% of those age 65 or over.

References

External links
City of Springfield

Cities in Calhoun County, Michigan
Enclaves in the United States